Democratic Republic of the Congo–Spain relations are the bilateral relations between the Democratic Republic of the Congo and Spain. The Democratic Republic of the Congo has an embassy in Madrid. And Spain has an embassy in Kinshasa.

Diplomatic relations 
Relations between Spain and the DRC have been traditionally good and in recent years, several new areas are being deepened, in line with the progress in the stabilization and pacification of the R.D. of Congo and the increase in the presence of the companies in the African continent.

Economic relations 

On November 9, 2011, two bilateral renegotiation agreements (prior step for subsequent forgiveness) of debt with ICO and CESCE were signed, as a result of the agreement reached in February 2010 at the Paris Club. The refinanced debt stock amounts to $14.72 million, of which $7.57 million corresponds to FAD credits of the ICO and $7.15 to CESCE.

At the end of 2014, the procedures for the transformation of this debt into cooperation projects began. The presence of Spanish companies in DRC has been increasing as a result of the expansion of Spanish exports and the search for new opportunities started. With the exception of Elector, the rest of Spanish companies in DRC are still little or standard-sized, but they are doing pretty well by participating in international competitions and in some merely national cases (Kisangani airport endowment or coin making for the National Bank of the DRC). The amount of the contracts won in competitions in the DRC was nearly 200.000 euros in 2014, highlighting the contracts obtained by ELECNOR and AEE, both in the sector of electrical infrastructure renovation.

With regard to imports and exports, current data indicate a clear increase in exports that have increased from 20 million in 2011 and 12 to 32 in 2013 and 29 in the first three quarters of 2014, so it is practically Surely the figure for the previous year will be exceeded.

The same does not happen with imports that are more irregular, since they depend on purchases of crude oil, while in 2013 they reached 118 million, in the first three quarters of 2014 they fell to just 16 million euros. The main imported products are fuels, mineral and copper oils; the rest of the Spanish imports of DRC are kept in products such as wood, cocoa, oilseeds, etc.

Spanish exports have undergone some modification not only in quantity but in their content. Indeed, exporting fuels and lubricants we are exporting iron and steel manufactures as the first item and various food preparations second. Only thirdly, fuels are exported. Appliances and electrical equipment occupy the fourth place followed by perfumery, canned meat or fish, ceramic products, etc.

There are no figures or information of interest regarding trade in services. Tourism with other countries in the region both from the point of view of origin and destination is not significant because it is a marginal activity.

Cooperation 
The DRC occupies the penultimate position on the Human Development Index. Fragile state, with high poverty indicators that affect the whole country and a war situation in a good part of the Eastern provinces. The Spanish Cooperation, present since the beginning of the 2000s and with the Technical Cooperation Office opened in 2010, begins an exit process in 2012 due to the redefinition of the external presence of the Spanish Cooperation, and is canceled in April 2013, the consequence of the new Cooperation Master Plan, in which the DRC loses its status as a priority country.

Until 2012, the volume of ODA with DRC placed Spain among the top 10 donors. However, Spain continues to maintain an important presence in the humanitarian field, a sector to which AECID allocates about 5 million euros (4,940,110) through the contribution to the Common Humanitarian Fund, to humanitarian coordination actions carried out by OCHA and various projects to assist victims of armed conflicts and epidemics executed by UNICEF, Doctors Without Borders and Caritas.

Decentralized Cooperation has followed an evolution partially similar to that of AECID, reducing the volume of financial resources. The Autonomous Community of Andalusia (education) and the Basque Country and Navarra (health and education) maintain a certain presence. The same does not happen in the field of Cultural Cooperation, where throughout the year 2014 and despite having a small budget, a total of forty cultural activities have been carried out, including those dedicated to the Prince of Asturias Award for La Concordia, Caddy Adzuba, photographer Isabel Muñoz, the Conference on Spanish Music or theater and a long etcetera.

See also  
 Foreign relations of the Democratic Republic of the Congo
 Foreign relations of Spain

References 

 
Spain
Democratic Republic of the Congo